TerrorVision is the tenth studio album by Belgian death metal band Aborted, released on September 21, 2018, via Century Media Records. It is the first album to feature bassist Stefano Franceschini, and the last album with guitarist Mendel Bij De Leij.

Background and recording
On February 21, 2018, the band finished the writing process for the album. The album was recorded at Kohlekeller Studios and produced by Kristian "Kohle" Kohlmannslehner, who previously worked with the band's Termination Redux EP, Retrogore and Bathos EP. The recording sessions had officially concluded on April 11, 2018.

The band commented on the recording process of the new album:

Vocalist Sven de Caluwé elaborated on topics of the new album:

Release
On March 27, 2018, the band announced that their new album will be titled TerrorVision and would be released on September 21, 2018, via Century Media. On June 29, 2018, the band revealed details, tracklist and cover art for TerrorVision. The first single of the album "Squalor Opera" was digitally released on July 6, 2018, accompanying a music video. A lyric video for the title track "TerrorVision" was available for streaming on August 3, 2018. The third song "Vespertine Decay" was also available for streaming on September 6, 2018.

Track listing

Personnel
Aborted
 Sven de Caluwé – vocals
 Mendel bij de Lei – guitars
 Ian Jekelis – guitars
 Stefano Franceschini – bass
 Ken Bedene – drums

Additional musician
 Seth Siro Anton  – guest vocals 
 Sebastian Grihm  – guest vocals 
 Julien Truchan  – guest vocals 
 Kristian "Kohle" Kohlmannslehner – keyboards, samples

Production
 Kristian Kohlmannslehner – production, recording, re-amping , mixing, mastering
 Aborted – production
 Pär Olofsson – cover art, artwork
 Coki Greenway – artwork
 Scanline – design
 Tim Tronckoe – photography

References

2018 albums
Aborted (band) albums
Century Media Records albums